Cellulomonas pakistanensis is a plant-growth-promoting, facultatively anaerobic, moderately halotolerant rod-shaped and motile bacterium from the genus Cellulomonas which has been isolated from paddy grains from the National Agricultural Research Centre in Pakistan.

References

 

Micrococcales
Bacteria described in 2014